Harwell is a village and civil parish in the Vale of White Horse about  west of Didcot,  east of Wantage and  south of Oxford. Historically in Berkshire, it has been administered as part of Oxfordshire, England, since the 1974 boundary changes. The parish includes part of the Milton Park business park in the north and part of Harwell Science and Innovation Campus in the southwest. In the east it includes part of the new Great Western Park housing estate that is contiguous with the built-up area of Didcot. The 2011 census recorded the parish's population as 2,349.

Toponymy
The earliest known surviving records of Harwell's name are 10th-century Saxon charters now reproduced in the Cartularium Saxonicum. One from 956 records Horn Down, a nearby hill, as Harandúne, which is derived from the Old English for "grey hill". The same charter records the manor as Haranwylle, which comes from the Old English for "stream by or coming from Horn Hill". A slightly later charter, from 973, records the manor as Harawille. The Domesday Book of 1086 records the manor as Harwelle. Another 11th-century source records it as Harowell. One 13th-century document records it as Arewell. Other 13th- and 14th-century sources record it as Harewell.

Parish church
The Church of England parish church of Saint Matthew may date from the 11th century. In 1962 The Times reported that walling had been found west of the tower indicating where a former nave had been. The herringbone layering of the masonry suggested that an 11th-century date is likely. At the same time a pewter chalice from about 1200 was found.  The present nave, east of the tower, was built in about 1200. This second nave has north and south aisles with three-bay arcades. The west tower may have been at the same time, but its Early English Gothic bell openings suggest that it may not have been finished until the middle of the 13th century. The Decorated Gothic chancel is early 14th century and has a five-light east window. The rood screen is probably of the same date, but the screen's Perpendicular Gothic top is later.

The tower has a ring of eight bells. Joseph Carter, who was Master bellfounder at the Whitechapel Bell Foundry and also had a foundry at Reading, cast the fourth bell in 1590 and the seventh bell in 1597. William Yare of Reading cast the third and fifth bells in 1611 and the sixth and tenor bells in 1612. John Taylor & Co of Loughborough cast the treble and second bells in 1932, completing the present ring. St. Matthew's also has a Sanctus bell cast by Robert I Wells of Aldbourne, Wiltshire in the 18th century. There is a single-handed clock on the tower's west face. In 1975 a two-storey extension was built on the north wall which now includes a parish office. A new church hall was built in 1994. St Matthew's parish now shares a rector with the parish of All Saints, Chilton.

Economic and social history

Harwell contains two 13th-century houses, each of which is a Grade II* listed building. Lime Tree Cottage in the High Street was built about 1250 and remodelled about 1300. A cross-wing was added about 1360 and the house was given a new front about 1700. Gable Cottage and Tibbleton Cottage in Wellshead Lane were originally one timber-framed house, built in about 1295 and extended with a new front range in the 17th century. Bayllols Manor house at Middle Farm is a timber-framed 14th-century hall house, and its service wing may be the remains of a 13th-century building. In 1589 an upper floor was inserted in the 14th-century hall and some pargeting was applied. The farm has two 14th-century barns, each of which is Grade II* listed. One is the Cherry Barn, which was built about 1350 and has 15th- and 17th-century outbuildings. The other was built around 1365 and has a cruck frame.

The White Hart in the High Street is an early 17th-century timber-framed building with early 18th- and mid-19th century brick-built extensions. It now trades as the Hart of Harwell pub and restaurant. Harwell once had five pubs and a brewery. The former brewery is a 17th-century building in the High Street with an 18th-century malt house and 19th-century extension. It is now a private house. The Crown in the High Street was converted into a nursing home, which was run by Southern Cross Healthcare and ceased trading in 2012. The Chequers, The Crispin and The Kicking Donkey have all been converted to private houses. On 4 April 1899 Berkshire Constabulary PC John Charlton was killed in an affray outside the Chequers. His two killers were felled and arrested by another officer, PC Thomas Hewett and later sentenced to 20 years hard labour for manslaughter. Until the Second World War Harwell may have been best known for its cherry orchards.

Geering Almshouses are a row of brick-built almshouses built by a charity established in 1715 but the houses themselves may not have been built until about 1723. The almshouses are a Grade II* listed building. The Great Western Main Line was built through the north of the parish and opened in 1840. In 1964 British Railways closed Steventon station, making Didcot (now ) Harwell's nearest rail link.

Airfield and Atomic Energy Research Establishment

RAF Harwell was built in 1937. It spans the parish boundaries between Harwell, Chilton and East Hendred. The airfield was used in World War II to launch troop-carrying military gliders for the invasion of Normandy.  In 1946 the airfield was taken over to be the new Atomic Energy Research Establishment, the main centre for nuclear power research in the UK, and become Harwell Laboratory. It was the site of Europe's first nuclear reactor in 1946, and once had five nuclear reactors, all of which have been shut down. Two have been completely dismantled, and the other three will be decommissioned by 2022.

Other parts of the airfield were later used by other scientific organisations, including the Science and Technology Facilities Council's Rutherford Appleton Laboratory which runs the ISIS neutron source and hosts the Diamond Light Source synchrotron joint venture. Part of the Atomic Energy Research Establishment is now operated by Research Sites Restoration Limited which is undertaking decommissioning work on behalf of the Nuclear Decommissioning Authority. The former airfield site as a whole is now the Harwell Science and Innovation Campus and is managed by the Australian-based Goodman property group.

Amenities

Harwell's remaining public house, The Hart of Harwell, is at the junction of the High Street and Burr Street. The village has two shops: a butcher and a combined newsagent and off licence. The village has clubs and societies including The Harwellian Club, a Scout troop, a tennis club, a horticultural society, Harwell Feast Committee, Harwell Rugby Club, football clubs, and others. Harwell Feast is a celebration held on the Monday of the Late May Bank Holiday each year. The celebrations include a parade of decorated floats and people through the village. The recreation ground hosts fund-raising stalls and displays including sheepdog handling and historic cars. Either a cow or two pigs are roasted for the feast.

Buses

Several Thames Travel bus routes serve Harwell. Route 33 links Harwell village and campus with Abingdon, Didcot, Milton Park and Wantage from Mondays to Fridays. Route 98 links Harwell village and campus with Didcot via the Great Western Park housing estate. Route 99 links Great Western Park with the Milton Park business estate from Mondays to Fridays. It has no Saturday or Sunday service. Route X32 links Harwell village and campus with Abingdon, Didcot, Milton Park and Oxford daily, and from Mondays to Saturdays also serves Wantage. Route X33 links Harwell village and campus with Abingdon, Didcot, Milton Park and Wantage from Mondays to Saturdays. It has no Sunday service Route X34 is a limited service between Harwell campus and Oxford that runs from Mondays to Fridays only.

Notable residents
Humphry Bowen (1929–2001), chemist and botanist
Christopher Elderfield (1607–52), Caroline Divine and author
Klaus Fuchs (1911–88), nuclear scientist and Soviet spy
 Eric Stanley Greenwood (1906–79), test pilot, first man ever to exceed  in level flight
John Harewell, Bishop of Bath and Wells 1366–86

References

Bibliography

External links

Harwell Parish Council

Civil parishes in Oxfordshire
Vale of White Horse
Villages in Oxfordshire